Zygophyllaceae is a family of flowering plants that contains the bean-caper and caltrop. The family includes around 285 species in 22 genera.

Plants in the family Zygophyllaceae may be trees, shrubs, or herbs. They are often found in dry habitats. The leaves are usually opposite, often with stipules and spines. Some are cultivated as ornamental plants, such as species of the Guaiacum, Zygophyllum, Tribulus, and Larrea genera. King Clone, a creosote bush (Larrea tridentata) in California, is among the world's oldest living organisms.

Genera

Peganum was in Zygophyllaceae before being moved to the newly created family Nitrariaceae.

Systematics
In the APG III system of classification, the families Zygophyllaceae and Krameriaceae compose the order Zygophyllales. In the previous version of their classification system, the Angiosperm Phylogeny Group had included the option of placing Krameria within Zygophyllaceae.

Zygophyllaceae are divided into five subfamilies. Molecular phylogenies of the family were published in 2000 and 2018. Phylogenies of groups within the family, particularly the predominantly southern African species of Zygophylloideae have also been published.

Modern molecular phylogenetics suggest the following relationships:

References

External links
 Family Zygophyllaceae Flowers in Israel
 Chilean Zygophyllaceae Chileflora

 
Rosid families